Loyalist College (formally Loyalist College of Applied Arts and Technology) is an English-language college in Belleville, Ontario, Canada.

History 

Prior to the 1960s, only trade schools co-existed with universities in the province of Ontario at the post-secondary level, most of which had been established primarily to help veterans reintegrate into society in the post-war years. Loyalist College was founded in 1967 as part of a provincial initiative to create many such institutions to provide career-oriented diploma and certificate courses, as well as continuing education programs to Ontario communities. The name of the college reflects the area's original settlement by United Empire Loyalists.

Originally operated out of a local high school, Loyalist College moved to its present  campus on Wallbridge-Loyalist Road in 1968. The college operates a satellite campus in Bancroft, Ontario and is associated with First Nations Technical Institute in the Tyendinaga Mohawk Territory reserve.

Athletics 

Loyalist's intercollegiate sports teams use the name "Lancers".  The school colours are royal blue and scarlet.

Current athletic teams
Men's Volleyball
Women's Volleyball
Men's Basketball
Women's Basketball
Men's Rugby
Women’s Rugby 7s
Women's Soccer
Cross-country

Residence 

Loyalist College houses some of its students in the Loyalist College Residence located on the college campus. The residence contains five buildings and holds approximately 474 students. There are also 4 townhouse blocks housing 112 students. Located on the residence grounds is Residence Commons. This building contains laundry facilities, computer access, security office, food station and entertainment area. The entertainment area includes pool tables, ping-pong and television for student use.

Scholarships
The College joined Project Hero, a scholarship program cofounded by General (Ret'd) Rick Hillier for the families of fallen Canadian Forces members.

Notable students, alumni and faculty
 Henry Joseph Maloney, first chairman of the board
Former CHFI-FM Morning Host Erin Davis, now Victoria, B.C.
 Ernie Parsons Former MPP for Prince Edward—Hastings (Former Faculty)
 Jamie Schmale MP for Haliburton-Kawartha Lakes-Brock
 Todd Smith Ontario Minister of Energy and MPP for Bay of Quinte
 Laurie Scott MPP for Haliburton—Kawartha Lakes—Brock
The Honourable Chris d'Entremont MP for West Nova and former MLA for Argyle-Barrington
David Williams – former professional cyclist

See also 
 Canadian government scientific research organizations
 Canadian industrial research and development organizations
 Canadian Interuniversity Sport
 Canadian university scientific research organizations
 Higher education in Ontario
 List of colleges in Ontario

References

External links 

 Loyalist College website

Colleges in Ontario
Educational institutions established in 1967
Education in Belleville, Ontario
Buildings and structures in Hastings County
1967 establishments in Ontario